Ipolytarnóc is a village in Hungary, Nógrád county. There is a fossil site close to it, the Ipolytarnoc Fossils Nature Conservation Area.

Fossils
Sometimes referred to as the "Prehistoric Pompeii", Ipolytarnóc is the location of 23 to 17 million year old fossils. These include the teeth of 24 species of sharks as well as the teeth of crocodiles and dolphins, an almost 100 m tall petrified pine, more than 15,000 subtropical exotic leaves and 3,000 animal footprints of 11 species. This is one of the world's richest complex fossil footprint find sites. The fossils were preserved due to a volcanic catastrophe which buried a whole subtropical jungle under volcanic ash.

The site became protected in 1944 and is managed by the Directorate of the Bükk National Park. The site became the main gateway to the world's second transborder geopark, the Novohrad – Nógrád Geopark, in 2010. The site provides several day-long programmes, including guided tours along its geological study trail and 4D movies about the prehistoric past in its Visitor Centre. The geological trail was opened to the public in 1986.

External links
 http://osmaradvanyok.hu
 Ipolytarnóc on Vendégváró (Hungary starts here)
 Street map 

Paleontological sites of Europe
Fossil trackways
Paleontology in Hungary